Virginia Water Lake lies on the southern edge of Windsor Great Park, in the borough of Runnymede in Surrey and the civil parishes of Old Windsor and Sunningdale in Berkshire, in England. It is a man-made lake taking its name from a natural body of water of the same name. There is a village of Virginia Water which stretches out to the east of the lake. The grounds of the lake, nearby Fort Belvedere, and the Clockcase are all Grade I listed on the Register of Historic Parks and Gardens.

History
Virginia Water Lake was originally little more than a stream, which existed from at least the 17th century and may well be named after Elizabeth I, the Virgin Queen, although this is not certain. The lake itself was begun in 1746 by William, Duke of Cumberland who was then Ranger of the Park. His own regiment, the 23rd Regiment of Foot, undertook the construction. The original lake was much smaller than the current form, and was destroyed in a flood in 1768. In 1780 Paul and Thomas Sandby began construction of a much larger lake at the site, and went on to add an artificial waterfall, Meadow Pond and Obelisk Pond.

In 2022, the Libyan government questioned the legality of the ruin's acquisition and asked for them to be returned.

In 1834, a miniature sailing frigate, the Royal Adelaide, was constructed at Sheerness for King William IV, was dismantled and transported overland to Virginia Water where it was reassembled and launched for sail training of the royal princes. It was broken up in 1877 but the guns were donated to the Royal Yacht Squadron at Cowes Castle.
 
During World War II, the lake was drained, as its obvious shape provided enemy guidance at night to Windsor and other important military targets in the area.

The River Bourne provides the water for the lake and it exits the lake at the eastern end after the cascading waterfall.

In popular culture
The lake has been used for lakeside scenes for the Harry Potter films. The Scottish alternative was deemed unsuitable due to the number of midges. The Lake was also used for scenes in the 2014 film Into The Woods. It was also used as the scene for the drone strike attack scenes in the 2019 action thriller movie Angel Has Fallen.

Gallery

References

Further reading
 
 Taylor, W. F. (1800). W.F. Taylor's guide to Windsor Castle, Eton, and Virginia Water: Arranged in the most concise form, and embracing a description of the gold pantry, and the interior of the private apartments, with catalogue of the paintings in the state rooms of the royal residence, with explanatory references to the most attractive and picturesque scenery, and other objects of interest to visitors in the vicinities of Windsor and Eton. Windsor: W.F. Taylor.

External links

Runnymede borough council - picture of cascading waterfall

Lakes of Berkshire
Lakes of Surrey
Grade I listed parks and gardens in Surrey
Windsor Great Park
Artificial lakes
Protected areas of Berkshire
Protected areas of Surrey